The 1961 Florida A&M Rattlers football team was an American football team that represented Florida A&M University as a member of the Southern Intercollegiate Athletic Conference (SIAC) during the 1961 NCAA College  Division football season. The team was ranked No. 4 in the final 1961 AP small college poll and No. 6 in the final UPI coaches poll. The team played its home games at Bragg Memorial Stadium in Tallahassee, Florida.

The team's statistical leaders included Robert Paremore with 376 rushing yards, 11 touchdowns and 66 points scored, Emory Collier with 742 passing yards, and Al Denson with 395 receiving yards.

Schedule

References

Florida AandM
Florida A&M Rattlers football seasons
Black college football national champions
College football undefeated seasons
Florida AandM Rattlers football